Riverhead Networks was a computer security company based in Netanya, Israel  and Cupertino, California. The company was acquired by Cisco Systems on March 22, 2004.

History
Riverhead Networks was founded by Yehuda Afek, Anat Bremler-Barr, Dan Touitou, and Yuval Rachmilevitz in 2000 in Tel Aviv, Israel. Initial funding was provided by Gemini Israel Funds, KUR ventures, and Intel Investment. On March 22, 2004 Cisco Systems paid $44 million to acquire full control of the company ($5 million of which were Cisco's own round B invested money). Following the acquisition by Cisco the company's development center was relocated and merged with the existing Cisco Israel Development Center in Netanya

Technology
Riverhead Networks provided solutions for Distributed Denial of Service (DDoS) by using a series of complex algorithms to alert and prevent them. Riverhead Networks's technology would allow company's IT systems to continue operating, even in the midst of an unauthorized or DDoS malicious assault.

See also
 Distributed Denial of Service
 Silicon Wadi

External links
Riverhead Networks
Gemini Israel Funds

References

Cisco Systems acquisitions
Software companies of Israel
Electronics companies of Israel
Companies based in Tel Aviv